Scotts Ferry is an unincorporated community in Calhoun County, Florida, United States.  It is located on State Road 71.

Geography
Scotts Ferry is located at  (30.2953, -85.1317).
It was served by the Marianna and Blountstown Railroad.

References

Unincorporated communities in Calhoun County, Florida
Unincorporated communities in Florida